According to a 2009 estimate by the Council on Tall Buildings and Urban Habitat, Kuala Lumpur was projected to rank 10th among the cities with the most completed buildings above 100 metres with a combined height of 34,035 metres from its 244 high rise buildings in 2010. As of 2019, the city of Kuala Lumpur has over 1,900 completed high-rise buildings, of which over 700 are buildings standing taller than 100 m (328 ft); 170 are buildings over 150 m (492 ft), 42 are buildings over 200 m (656 ft) and 5 are buildings over 300 m (984 ft). The majority of them are located in the Kuala Lumpur City Centre (KLCC), Golden Triangle, Mont' Kiara and Old Downtown. The tallest building in Kuala Lumpur is Merdeka 118, which has 118 floors and stands 678.9 m (2,227 ft) in height. 

The history of skyscrapers in Kuala Lumpur began with the completion of the 73 m (239 ft) 18-story, Lee Yan Lian Building in 1945. Though not the city's first high-rise, it was the first building to surpass the 41 m (135 ft) spire of the Sultan Abdul Samad Building, which was built from 1894 to 1897. The Lee Yan Lian Building stood as the tallest in the city until it was in turn surpassed by the completion of the 77 m (253 ft) 20-story Malaysian Houses of Parliament, which opened in 1963. 

Kuala Lumpur went through a major building boom in the 1970s and 1980s that resulted from the city's rapid industrialisation. This period saw the construction of the Takaful Tower (formerly known as UMBC Building and then the Sime Bank Building), which was completed in 1971 and stands at 110 m (361 ft), making it Malaysia's first building over 100 m (328 ft). The first true skyscraper in Kuala Lumpur was Menara Bumiputera (today known as Menara Bank Muamalat), which was completed in 1978 and stands at 150.5 m (494 ft). Maybank Tower, standing at 243.5 m (799 ft), held the record of being the tallest building in Kuala Lumpur and Malaysia for nearly 10 years. The 50-story skyscraper holds the distinction of being the first building over 200 m (656 ft) in Kuala Lumpur and at the time of its completion in 1987, the building was the third-tallest building in Asia and the world outside of North America, after the Overseas Union Bank Centre in Singapore and the 63 Building in Seoul, South Korea. Kuala Lumpur's skyscraper-building boom continued during the 1990s and 2000s, many of them residential towers. Since 2000, there has been a sharp increase in the number of skyscrapers under construction in the city area, particularly in the KLCC, Mont' Kiara and Bukit Bintang. There are also several new skyscrapers under development in the Tun Razak Exchange and Tradewinds Square Complex districts.

Tallest buildings
This lists ranks Kuala Lumpur's skyscrapers that stand at least 150 m (492 ft) tall, based on standard height measurement. This includes spires and architectural details but does not include antenna masts. An equal sign (=) following a rank indicates the same height between two or more buildings. An asterisk (*) indicates that the building is still under construction, but has been topped out. The "Year" column indicates the year in which a building was completed.

Tallest under construction

Buildings that are under construction and have a planned height of at least 150 m (492 ft).

Tallest undergoing preparations

Buildings that are on preparation sites or ground works and have a planned height of at least 150 m (492 ft).

Tallest proposed

Buildings that are proposed and have a planned height of at least 150 m (492 ft).

Timeline of tallest buildings
This lists commercial buildings that once held the title of tallest building in Kuala Lumpur.

Buildings with this sign (*) indicate that they have been demolished.

See also
List of tallest buildings in the world
List of tallest buildings in Malaysia
List of tallest buildings in George Town
List of tallest buildings in Johor Bahru
List of tallest buildings in Kota Kinabalu

References
General
 Kuala Lumpur - Emporis.com
Specific

External links
 Diagram of Kuala Lumpur skyscrapers on SkyscraperPage
 List of all buildings in Kuala Lumpur on CTBUH
 

Kuala Lumpur